Wuyue was a dynastic state of China and one of the Ten Kingdoms during the Five Dynasties and Ten Kingdoms period of Chinese history. It was ruled by the Qian clan of Haiyan (海鹽錢氏), whose family name remains widespread in the kingdom's former territory.

Founding

Beginning in 887, the Qian family provided military leaders (or jiedushi) to the Tang dynasty.  Qian Liu was named Prince of Yue in 902, with the title of Prince of Wu added two years later.  In 907, when the Tang dynasty fell and was replaced in the north by the Later Liang, military leaders in the south formed their own kingdoms. Qian Liu used his position to proclaim himself the King of Wuyue. This signaled the beginning of the Five Dynasties and Ten Kingdoms period which would last until the founding of the Song dynasty in 960.

Origin of name
The name Wuyue comes from the combination of Wu Kingdom and Yue Kingdom, two ancient kingdoms during the Spring and Autumn period from 770 to 476 BC.

Territorial extent
With its capital in Hangzhou, also called "Xifu", the kingdom included present-day Zhejiang, Shanghai, along with the southern portion of Jiangsu Province.  It also later absorbed some of the northern part of Fujian when the Min Kingdom fell in 945.  The territorial extent of Wuyue roughly corresponded to the territories of the ancient Yue, but not the ancient Wu—which led to charges by the neighboring Wu (also known as Southern Wu) that Wuyue had designs on its territory, and the name was a source of tension for years between the two states.

In the early decades of its existence, Wuyue bordered the Min Kingdom on its south and the Southern Tang Kingdom on its west and north.  With the rebellion of Yin from the Min from 943 to 945, Wuyue briefly had a third border.  However, before long, Wuyue was completely encircled (except for the East China Sea) as both Yin and Min were absorbed by the Southern Tang.

The population was approximately 550,700 households, with many people living in commercial centers and major seaports.

Administrative divisions

Wuyue was not a large kingdom compared to many of its neighbors. Although initially 12 prefectures (州), it later consisted of 13 prefectures and 86 counties or sub-prefectures (縣). Fuzhou was incorporated into Wuyue as its 13th prefecture, after the Min court declared allegiance to it as they were besieged by Southern Tang.

Former Administrative Divisions
 Changzhou (常州) from 886 to 891 CE, ceded to Yang Xingmi
 Runzhou (潤州) from 886 to 891 CE, ceded to Yang Xingmi

Reign of Qian Liu

Under Qian Liu's reign, Wuyue prospered economically and freely developed its own regional culture that continues to this day. He developed the coastal kingdom's agriculture, built seawalls, expanded Hangzhou, dredged rivers and lakes, and encouraged sea transport and trade. On his death-bed he urged a benign administration of state affairs and his words were strictly followed by four succeeding kings.

Foreign diplomacy

In 935, Wuyue established official diplomatic relations with Japan.  The kingdom also took advantage of its maritime location to maintain diplomatic contacts with north China, the Khitans, Bohai, and the Korean states of Later Baekje, Goryeo, and Silla. Buddhism played a large role in the diplomatic relations with Japan and Goryeo. Japanese and Korean monks traveled to Wuyue, while monks from Wuyue went to Japan and Korea as well. The rulers of Wuyue also tried to find sutras that had been lost during the turbulent final years of the Tang. In 947, Qian Zuo sent gifts to Japan and offered to buy any sutras; however none were available. In 961, Qian Chu sent fifty precious objects and a letter to Goryeo inquiring about the missing sutras, and Gwangjong sent the monk Jegwan with a complete set of Tiantai sutras.

Fall of the kingdom

In 978, in the face of certain annihilation from northern imperial Chinese troops, the last king of Wuyue, Qian Chu, pledged allegiance to the Song dynasty, saving his people from war and economic destruction.  While Qian Chu nominally remained king, Wuyue was absorbed into the Song dynasty, effectively ending the kingdom. The last king died in 988.

Legacy

Cultural legacy

The Wuyue Kingdom cemented the cultural and economic dominance of the Wuyue region in China for centuries to come, as well as creating a lasting regional cultural tradition distinctive from the rest of China.  The leaders of the kingdom were noted patrons of Buddhism, and architecture, temple decoration, and religious sculptures related to Buddhism.  The cultural distinctiveness that began developing over this period persists to this day as the Wuyue region speaks a group of Chinese languages called Wu (the most famous variant of which is Shanghainese), has distinctive cuisine and other cultural traits. The Baochu Pagoda, constructed during the reign of Qian Chu, was one of many temples and pagodas built under the patronage of the Wuyue kings.

Infrastructure

The physical legacy of the Wuyue Kingdom was the creation of the system of canals and dikes which allowed the region to become the most agriculturally rich region of China for many centuries. As a result, shrines to Qian Liu sprang up all across the region, and many can still be found today.

Personal legacy
Qian Liu was often known as the "Dragon King" or the "Sea Dragon King" because of his extensive hydro-engineering schemes which "tamed" the seas. The kings of Wuyue continue to enjoy positive treatment in orthodox history. They were popularly revered because of the hydro-engineering works, ensuring the economic prosperity of the region, and for finally surrendering to the Song dynasty, which ensured both a unified Chinese nation and that the region would not be ravaged by war.

During the early Song dynasty, the Qian royal family were treated as second only to the ruling Zhao imperial family, as reflected in the Hundred Family Surnames. Subsequently, many shrines were erected across the Wuyue region where the kings of Wuyue were memorialised, and sometimes, worshipped as dictating weather and agriculture. Many of these shrines, known as "Shrine of the Qian King" or "Temple to the Qian King", remain today, the most popularly visited example being that near West Lake in Hangzhou.

Qian Liu reputedly had more than a hundred sons born to many different wives and concubines. His progeny were posted to various parts of the kingdom. The Qian family remains very widely spread throughout the region. Several branches are considered "prominent families" (望族) in their local areas.

Rulers

Qian Chu submitted to the Song dynasty in 978 and continued to reign nominally, successively as King of Huaihai, King of Hannan, King of Hanyang and Prince of Xu, and finally Prince of Deng, until his death in 988. After his death he was also posthumously created King of Qin.

Rulers family tree

References

Citations

Sources

 Chavannes, Edouard. "Le royaume de Wou et de Yue", T'oung Pao 17: 129–264 (1916).

 
Five Dynasties and Ten Kingdoms
Former countries in Chinese history
10th-century establishments in China
907 establishments
978 disestablishments
10th-century disestablishments in China
States and territories established in the 900s
States and territories disestablished in the 970s
Wu (region)
Former kingdoms